The 1975 Princeton Tigers football team was an American football team that represented Princeton University during the 1975 NCAA Division I football season. Princeton finished fifth in the Ivy League.

In their third year under head coach Robert Casciola, the Tigers compiled a 4–5 record but outscored opponents 163 to 157. Edward E. Sheridan was the team captain.

Princeton's 3–4 conference record placed fifth in the Ivy League standings. The Tigers outscored Ivy opponents 132 to 128. 

Princeton played its home games at Palmer Stadium on the university campus in Princeton, New Jersey.

Schedule

References

Princeton
Princeton Tigers football seasons
Princeton Tigers football